Devons Road is a Docklands Light Railway (DLR) station located in between Bromley-by-Bow and Bow Common. The station takes its name from the B140 Devons Road and is between Langdon Park and Bow Church stations and is in Travelcard Zone 2. It is on the Stratford to Poplar branch of the DLR with services continuing on to Canary Wharf and Lewisham.

Connections
London Buses routes 108 and 323 serve the station.

References

External links 

 Docklands Light Railway website – Devons Road station page

Docklands Light Railway stations in the London Borough of Tower Hamlets
Railway stations in Great Britain opened in 1987
Bromley-by-Bow
Bow Common